Seasons of the Witch is an album by American heavy metal/horror punk band Gotham Road, released in 2003. The band features former Misfits singer Michale Graves who had just quit his previous band, Graves.

Track listing

2003 release 
 Seasons of the Witch
 Sidewalk Ends
 Melts Away
 Say Something
 Creo Burn
 Bits of Skin
 You Awful Me
 On My Way (bonus track)

2008 release 
 Seasons of the Witch
 Sidewalk Ends
 Melts Away
 Say Something
 Creo Burn
 Bits of Skin
 You Awful Me
 Attack of the Butterflies (bonus track on reissue)
 On My Way (bonus track on reissue)
 Drain (bonus track on reissue)
 All the Cars (bonus track on reissue)
 Bits of Skin (demo) (bonus track on reissue)
 Say Something (demo) (bonus track on reissue)
 Creo Burn (demo) (bonus track on reissue)
 Seasons of the Witch (demo) (bonus track on reissue)

Personnel 
 Michale Graves – vocals
 Loki – guitar
 JV Bastard – bass
 Paul Lifeless – drums

Releases 

 Seasons of the Witch (2003) – EP
 Seasons of the Witch (2008) – Internet-only LP

References 

2003 albums
Gotham Road albums